Peter Cunningham is an Irish novelist who is known for his historical novels about Ireland. His works have received several literary awards in Ireland and Europe. Cunningham's fiction is said to be distinguished by its fusing of political material with psychological realism and a lyrical sensitivity to place and people.

Career
Cunningham's first novel, Noble Lord, was a thriller, written under the pseudonym Peter Lauder.  He is best known for the historical novels The Sea and the Silence, Tapes of the River Delta, Consequences of ihe Heart and Love In One Edition, which chronicle the lives of local families during the twentieth century in Monument, Cunningham's fictional version of Waterford, Ireland. 

Cunningham's novel The Taoiseach,  based on the life of Charles J. Haughey, was a controversial bestseller. Capital Sins, a satirical novel, dealt with the collapse of the Irish economy during the 2008 financial crisis.

Critical reception
The Sea and the Silence (translated into French as La Mer et le silence) was awarded the Prix de l’Europe in 2013. This novel also won the Prix Caillou in France and was short-listed for the Prix des Lecteurs du Telégramme.

Consequences of the Heart was short-listed for the Kerry Listowel Writer's Prize. Acts of Allegiance was long-listed for the 2019 Dublin International Literary Award. In 2011 Cunningham won the Cecil Day-Lewis Bursary Award.

Personal life
Cunningham grew up in Waterford, where his family had lived since the mid-19th century.

Cunningham is a member of Aosdána. He has judged the Glen Dimplex Literary Awards and the Bantry Festival Writer's Prize. In 2017 he was one of the nominees for the new post of Irish Fiction Laureate, created by the Arts Council of Ireland.

Cunningham is married to Carol, a Jungian analyst, with whom he has six children. They live in County Kildare, Ireland.

References

External links
 Peter Cunningham website
 Peter Cunningham - Goodreads
 Peter Cunningham - Twitter
 Peter Wilben website

1947 births
Irish novelists
Living people
People educated at Glenstal Abbey School
Alumni of University College Dublin
Writers from Dublin (city)
Irish columnists
Irish male novelists